Marie Henriksen (born 31 August 1993) is a former Norwegian handball player for the club Byåsen HE.

She also represented Norway in the 2011 Women's Junior European Handball Championship, placing 12th.

She was near a position on the Norwegian national team many times, but has been very unlucky with serious injuries in her young career. Spring 2016 she suffered her third serious injury in her right knee and in March 2017 she announced that she was forced to retire because of her injuries, at age 23.

She is the younger sister of international footballer Markus Henriksen and daughter of Trond Henriksen.

Achievements 
World Youth Championship:
Silver Medalist: 2010

Individual awards
 Best Rookie of Postenligaen: 2009/2010
 All-Star Centre Back of the Youth World Championship: 2010
 All-Star Centre Back of Grundigligaen: 2015/2016

References

1993 births
Living people
Sportspeople from Trondheim
Norwegian female handball players
21st-century Norwegian women